Francis Moore "Farmer" Osborne (January 29, 1879 – November 16, 1956) was a college football player and coach as well as a reverend; once chaplain for Sewanee: The University of the South.

University of North Carolina
He was a prominent end for coach William A. Reynolds's North Carolina Tar Heels football teams of the University of North Carolina from 1898 to 1900.

1898
Osborne was a member of the 1898 team, the school's only undefeated team and the conference champion.

1900
He was captain of the 1900 team. Osborne was selected All-Southern.

Sewanee
He was the quarterback for the Sewanee Tigers in 1902, selected All-Southern. He then helped coach the team and taught at Sewanee for many years.

Reverend
He was rector of the Cavalry Episcopal church of Pittsburgh.

References

1879 births
1956 deaths
19th-century players of American football
American football ends
American football quarterbacks
North Carolina Tar Heels football players
Sewanee Tigers football coaches
Sewanee Tigers football players
All-Southern college football players
People from Fletcher, North Carolina
Players of American football from North Carolina